The Thane Municipal Corporation Election was held on 21st February 2017, for the City of Thane, Maharashtra, India. The main contenders for the election were the ruling Shiv Sena, Nationalist Congress Party, Bharatiya Janata Party and the Indian National Congress.

Results 
The ruling Shiv Sena became the largest party with gaining Majority, The Nationalist Congress Party won the same number of seats it won in 2012 in Thane Municipal Corporation Election, The Bharatiya Janata Party improved its performance.

By ward

References

Thane
Thane
2017 elections in India